Valentina Belotti (born 4 April 1980) is an Italian female mountain runner, world champion at the 2009 World Mountain Running Championships.

Biography
At individual senior level she won 4 medals (1 gold and 3 silver) at the World Mountain Running Championships and 3 (all silver) at the European Mountain Running Championships. She also competed at three editions of the IAAF World Cross Country Championships at senior level (2002, 2004, 2007). She won also six senior national championships.

National titles
Italian Mountain Running Championships
Mountain running: 2010, 2016 (2)
Italian Vertical Kilometer Championships
Vertical kilometer: 2013, 2016, 2017 (3)

References

External links
 

1980 births
Living people
Italian female mountain runners
Italian female long-distance runners
Italian sky runners
World Mountain Running Championships winners